Second is the second official recording by the metal band Baroness. It was recorded in one session, with the exception of the vocals. The artwork was done by Baroness singer John Baizley.

Track listing
All songs written by Baroness. Lyrics by John Baizley.

Personnel
 John Baizley - vocals/guitar
 Allen Blickle - drums
 Tim Loose - guitar
 Summer Welch - bass

References

External links
Vinyl Pressing Info and Pictures

2005 EPs
Baroness (band) EPs
Hyperrealist Records albums
Albums with cover art by John Dyer Baizley